Chernihiv Airport (also given as Chernihiv Shestovytsia)  is an airport in Ukraine located 15 km southwest of Chernihiv. Previously it had ICAO code UKRR. This airfield has been closed since 2002.

Parts of the 2017 Ukrainian blockbuster Cyborgs: Heroes Never Die were shot in the airport.

Gallery

See also
List of airports in Ukraine

References

External links
RussianAirFields.com

2002 disestablishments in Ukraine
Airports built in the Soviet Union
Defunct airports in Ukraine
Buildings and structures in Chernihiv